The ALCO 300 was an early diesel-electric switcher locomotive built by the American Locomotive Company (ALCO) of Schenectady, New York between 1931 and 1938.

Following purchase of the engine manufacturer McIntosh & Seymour in 1929, ALCO built a  box cab locomotive. This was the #300, an ALCO demonstrator. The engine used was the Model 330 and GE electrical transmission was used. Another demonstrator #300 was built as an end cab switcher in July 1931 also using General Electric electrical equipment. This unit was sold to the Lehigh Valley Railroad as its #102. A subsequent  end cab switcher was sold to the Lehigh Valley as its #103 in December 1931. A McIntosh and Seymour Box cab Lehigh Valley #125 was rebuilt with an ALCO 330 engine in 1931 and then renumbered Lehigh Valley #101.

Three more end cab  switchers were built in 1932 for stock demonstrators, but they were not sold until 1935. An additional two  end cab switchers were built in 1935. All these stock units and the two new end cab switchers were sold to the US Navy in 1935. The final two  end cab switchers were built in 1938 for the United Fruit Company's narrow gauge railroad in Panama.

None have been preserved.

See also 
 List of ALCO diesel locomotives
 List of MLW diesel locomotives

References
 
 Steinbrenner, Richard (2003) The American Locomotive Company A Centennial Remembrance. Chapter VI subchapter "ALCO's First Production Diesels".

External links

ALCO locomotives
B-B locomotives
Standard gauge locomotives of the United States
Railway locomotives introduced in 1931
Standard gauge locomotives of Panama
Scrapped locomotives